Curioseboda is a genus of moths belonging to the family Tortricidae. It contains only one species, Curioseboda probola, which is found in Thailand.

The wingspan is 12.5 mm. The ground colour of the forewings is brownish, paler in the terminal part of the wing. The costa is cream to before the middle, finely dotted brownish and two mostly concolorous transverse slender fasciae marked by brownish inner spots. The markings are limited to a dark brown blotch near the mid-costa followed by a cream rust group of scales. The hindwings are brownish grey.

Etymology
The genus name is derived from Latin curiosus (meaning interesting or curious) and the name of the similar genus Eboda. The species name refers to the costal scales of the forewings and is derived from Greek probolos (meaning extending forwards).

See also
List of Tortricidae genera

References

External links
tortricidae.com

Tortricini